The Men's 10 m platform competition of the 2020 European Aquatics Championships was held on 16 May 2021.

Results
The preliminary round was started at 12:00. The final was held at 19:10.

Green denotes finalists

References

Men's 10 m platform